David Dale Leeper (born October 30, 1959) is an American former professional baseball outfielder. He played professionally for the Kansas City Royals of the Major League Baseball(MLB).

Biography
Leeper was born in Santa Ana, California and graduated from Villa Park High School in Villa Park, California. He played college baseball at the University of Southern California.
 
He was drafted by the Kansas City Royals in the 1st round (23rd pick) of the 1981 Major League Baseball Draft. He played parts of two seasons in the majors for the Kansas City Royals in the 1984 season and the 1985 season. He managed three hits in 40 at bats.

References

External links

 Baseball Almanac

1959 births
Living people
American expatriate baseball players in Canada
Baseball players from California
Hawaii Islanders players
Jacksonville Suns players
Kansas City Royals players
Major League Baseball outfielders
Omaha Royals players
Portland Beavers players
Sportspeople from Santa Ana, California
USC Trojans baseball players
Vancouver Canadians players
Visalia Oaks players
Anchorage Glacier Pilots players